Paul Tawiah Quaye is a former Ghanaian police office and was the Inspector General of Police of the Ghana Police Service from 16 May 2009 to 5 February 2013.

References

Living people
Ghanaian police officers
Ghanaian Inspector Generals of Police
Year of birth missing (living people)